The Creed of the Kromon is a Big Finish Productions audio drama based on the long-running British science fiction television series Doctor Who. It is the first story to feature Conrad Westmaas as the new companion C'rizz. It is part of the "Divergent Universe" saga which continued until The Next Life, and is the first appearance of the recurring character, the Kro'ka.

Plot
Still in the Divergent universe, the Eighth Doctor and Charley are captured by the insect like Kromon. Charley is forced into becoming a hybrid-insect Queen, and the Doctor is forced to share his knowledge of space-time travel with the rapacious Kromon...

Cast
The Doctor — Paul McGann
Charley — India Fisher
C'rizz — Conrad Westmaas
The Kro'ka — Stephen Perring
The Oroog — Brian Cobby
L'da — Jane Hills
The Kromon — Daniel Hogarth and Stephen Perring

Continuity
As well as new companion C'rizz, the villain named The Kro'ka is also introduced in this story.  He appears in all but one of the following Divergent Universe stories.

External links
Big Finish Productions - The Creed of the Kromon

2004 audio plays
Eighth Doctor audio plays